Delias euphemia is a butterfly in the family Pieridae. It was described by Henley Grose-Smith in 1894. It is found in the Australasian realm where it is endemic to Biak.

The wingspan is about 55–65 mm.

References

External links
Delias at Markku Savela's Lepidoptera and Some Other Life Forms

euphemia
Butterflies described in 1894